( or  ; plural: ,  , or in Yiddish pontshke פּאָנטשקע) is a round jelly doughnut eaten in Israel and around the world on the Jewish festival of Hanukkah. The doughnut is deep-fried, injected with jam or custard, and then topped with powdered sugar. The doughnut recipe originated in Europe in the 16th century, and by the 19th century was known as a Berliner in Germany. Polish Jews, who called it a ponchik, fried the doughnut in schmaltz rather than lard due to kashrut laws. The ponchik was brought to Israel by Polish Jewish immigrants, where it was renamed the  based on the Talmud's description of a "spongy dough".

Background

On Hanukkah, Jews observe the custom of eating fried foods in commemoration of the miracle associated with the Temple oil. The tradition of eating deep-fried pastries on Hanukkah was considered ancient even in the time of the 12th-century rabbi Maimonides, whose father, Rabbi Maimon ben Yosef, wrote that "one must not make light of the custom of eating sofganim [fritters] on Chanukah. It is a custom of the Kadmonim [the ancient ones]". These sofganim were likely syrup-soaked fried cakes, akin to modern zalabiya in the Arab world.

Etymology
The Hebrew word sufganiyah is a neologism for pastry, based on the Talmudic words sofgan and sfogga, which refer to a "spongy dough". The word is built on the same root as the Modern Hebrew word for sponge (ספוג, sfog), which is derived from Ancient Greek σπόγγος spóggos. Sfenj, a Moroccan doughnut, comes from the same root.

A popular Israeli folktale holds that the word "sufganiyah" comes from the Hebrew expression "Sof Gan Yud-Heh" ("סוף גן יה"), meaning "the end of the Garden of the Lord"  (referring to the Garden of Eden). According to the legend, when Adam and Eve were cast out of the Garden by the Lord, He cheered them up by feeding them sufganiyot. No known commentator on the Tanakh supports this interpretation.

History

According to food historian Gil Marks, the recipe for a filled jelly doughnut was first published in a 1485 cookbook in Nuremberg. The "Gefüllte Krapfen" consisted of "a bit of jam sandwiched between two rounds of yeast bread dough and deep-fried in lard". This doughnut became popular in northern European countries from Denmark to Russia during the 16th century. In 19th-century Germany it began to be called a Berliner or a Bismarck, after German Chancellor Otto von Bismarck.

Among Polish Jews, the jelly doughnut was fried in oil or schmaltz rather than lard, due to kashrut laws. In Poland, these doughnuts were known as ponchkis. Polish Jewish immigrants to Mandatory Palestine brought along their recipe as well as the tradition of eating them on Hanukkah. In Israel, however, they took on a new name—sufganiyot—based on the Talmud's description of a "spongy dough" (see the Etymology section).

Description
The ponchik-style sufganiyah was originally made from two circles of dough surrounding a jelly filling, stuck together and fried in one piece. Although this method is still practiced, an easier technique commonly used today is to deep-fry whole balls of dough, and then inject them with a filling through a baker's syringe (or a special industrial machine).

Modern-day sufganiyot in Israel are made from sweet yeast dough, filled with plain red jelly (usually strawberry, sometimes raspberry), and topped with powdered sugar. Fancier versions are stuffed with dulce de leche, chocolate cream, vanilla cream, cappuccino, halva, creme espresso, chocolate truffle, or araq, and topped with various extravagant toppings, from coconut shavings and tiny vials of liquor to meringue and fruit pastes. In 2014 one Jerusalem bakery produced sufganiyah dough saturated with flavored vodka.

Mini sufganiyot
In 2016, Israeli bakeries began downsizing sufganiyot to appeal to health-conscious consumers, following an anti-junk food campaign by Health Minister Yaakov Litzman. The usual  size, packing 400 to 600 calories (1,700 to 2,500 kJ), now appears in  size with different fillings and toppings, earning the name "mini."

Popularity

In Israel
Until the 1920s, sufganiyot and latkes were of comparable popularity among Jews in Mandatory Palestine during the Hanukkah holiday. The Histadrut, Israel's national labor union formed in 1920, pushed to replace the homemade latke with the sufganiyah as Israel's quintessential Hanukkah food in order to provide more work for its members. Commercial bakeries began selling sufganiyot days and weeks before Hanukkah began, lengthening the employment period. Their effort was successful, and sufganiyot became the most popular food for Hanukkah in Israel. By the 21st century, more Israeli Jews report eating sufganiyot on Hanukkah than fasting on Yom Kippur.

Today sufganiyot are sold by Israeli bakeries as early as September. Angel Bakeries, the largest bakery in Israel, reportedly fries up more than 25,000 sufganiyot every day during the eight-day Hanukkah festival itself. Each batch uses  of dough and makes 1,600 sufganiyot. Local newspapers add to the excitement by rating the "best sufganiyah in town".

The Ministry of Defense buys upwards of 400,000 sufganiyot for its soldiers each Hanukkah. As the troops overwhelmingly prefer jelly-filled doughnuts, the Defense Ministry purchases 80% with jelly filling and 20% with chocolate filling.

In other Jewish communities

Sufganiyot are a relatively recent introduction to the United States, where latkes are the traditional Hanukkah food. According to Gil Marks, latke was still the dominant choice in American Jewish homes in 2012. Rabbi Levi Shemtov in 2019 said "Latkes used to dominate in the U.S., while doughnuts dominated in Israel. Now, I think both are equally popular in the U.S." 

The sufganiyah was introduced by American Jews who had visited or studied in Israel, and by Israeli Jews who had settled in the U.S. While sufganiyot were not commercially available in the United States before the 1970s, today bakeries in many Jewish communities sell sufganiyot, as do non-kosher bakeries. The doughnut chains Dunkin' Donuts and Krispy Kreme purvey sufganiyot in their kosher-certified outlets.

Sufganiyot are also sold in kosher shops in Europe. Smaller Jewish communities in Russia and Ukraine organize special "community bakes" to prepare sufganiyot for school and kindergarten parties.

Savory varieties
Savory sufganiyot also exist. In 2018, The Jerusalem Post reported on a new trend of savory sufganiyot in Manhattan eateries, in which the dough is filled with chicken schnitzel, lamb bacon, liver, or pastrami. Other savory varieties include:
Panzerotti in Italy, filled with mozzarella and tomato sauce.
 Lachmazikas in Spain, filled with everything from lamb and mushrooms to whitefish, ricotta, peppers, and herbs.
 Sambusa-inspired savory sufganiyot, filled with lentils and peas, are popular among Iraqi Jews in Israel.

Gallery

See also
 Bimuelos – Fritters served on Hanukkah by Sephardi Jews
  Bombolone
 Culture of Israel
 Fritas de prasa
 Israeli cuisine
 Latkes
 List of doughnut varieties
 Sfenj
 Zalabiyeh

Explanatory notes

References

External links

 Making non-traditional sufganiyot : a demonstration video with Phyllis Glazer
 Sufganiyot – The Best  
 The best Hanukkah sufganiyot in Israel

Doughnuts
Hanukkah foods
Hanukkah traditions
Israeli desserts
Jewish baked goods
Jewish cuisine
Hebrew words and phrases